The 5000 series is a series of Chicago "L" car built between 2009 and 2015 by Bombardier Transportation of Plattsburgh, New York. A $577 million order for 406 cars was placed in 2006. In July 2011, the CTA ordered 300 more cars (later increased to 308 cars) for $331 million as an option on the first contract.

The 5000-series reuses a numbering set used on 4 experimental articulated train-sets that were in service from 1947 to 1985. These are the first CTA railcars to have interior LED signs that display date and time.

Specifications
The first 10 cars began testing in passenger service on April 19, 2010. Following completion of the testing phase and acceptance of the rail cars, a dozen cars are expected to be delivered every month until all cars are in service.

Seating is longitudinal, with passengers facing a wider aisle. This has increased capacity by 20–30% to a total of 123. Vertical stanchions and horizontal overhead bars with straps have been added throughout much of the car to give standing passengers more to hold on to. New amenities include seven security cameras per car, new electronic signs making announcements visually, and "active" system maps showing the location of the train on the line.
Due to the 5000-series not being in the High-Performance family of railcars (as of 2016, the only remaining series of this family of cars are the 2600 and 3200 series), and having AC propulsion, the 5000-Series are unable to MU with other series of railcars in the CTA's fleet, which are all High-Performance cars. This is not a complication for the 5000-series for the most part, since almost  all of the lines they are assigned to are entirely this railcar. The last 2600-series cars were removed from service from the Red Line in November 2015, leaving only the Blue and Orange Lines to operate them.

Features and usage
The 5000-series use technologies such as AC traction equipment that will enhance operations and maintenance and provide a smoother, more comfortable ride. Cars 5001–5114 originally came with orange LED destination signs; cars beginning with unit 5115–5116 came equipped with colored LED destination signs that can be programmed for the color of the line(s) that they will eventually operate on (the amber-only signs in the existing cars began to be replaced with the colored signs starting mid-August 2012 with units 5095–5096 and 5097–5098, which were originally delivered to the CTA with the amber signs but were retrofitted with the colored signs before they were placed into service).

The first cars were placed into regular service on November 8, 2011, on the Pink Line. The Pink Line was the first line to be fully equipped with the 5000-series cars in June 2012, followed by the Green Line in May 2013, the Yellow Line in March 2014, the Purple Line in March 2015, and the Red Line in November 2015. The CTA planned on assigning some 5000-series cars to the Orange Line, replacing its 2600-series cars, which were supposed to be an interim replacement for the line's 2400-series cars until the Red Line is fully equipped with the 5000-series cars. However, as of November 2015, the assignment of 5000-series cars to the Orange Line is now unlikely since delivery of all 5000-series cars is complete and all 5000-series cars are completely assigned to other lines, thus the assignment of 2600-series cars to the Orange Line is now a permanent assignment until the delivery of the new 7000-series cars.

Issues
The fleet was taken out of service for inspections in December 2011 concerning irregularities found in the wheel components of the cars. They went back into service on May 7, 2012. As of November 2015, these cars are the most abundant in the CTA's fleet, making up the entire Pink, Green, Yellow, Purple, and Red Line fleets.

Controversies
The 5000-series' seating arrangement has been met with negative feedback from riders. One of the requirements the CTA had during the bidding process was that manufacturers provide more than one interior layout for a hybrid seating configuration (both longitudinal and lateral), to minimize discomfort as well as maximizing passenger flow.

See also
 R160 (New York City Subway car)
 R179 (New York City Subway car)

References

Further reading

External links 
 Official CTA page on the 5000-series trains (archived)
 CTA Connections - feature on 5000-series trains

Train-related introductions in 2011
Bombardier Transportation multiple units
Chicago "L" rolling stock